Mihail Savenco was a Moldovan politician of Ukrainian descent. He was a high-ranking official of the Moldavian Democratic Republic.

Biography 

He served as Director General for Justice in Pantelimon Erhan Cabinet and Daniel Ciugureanu cabinet. Also he served as member of the Parliament of Moldova (1917-1918).

He opposed the union of Bessarabia with Romania. Savenco joined a self-appointed team of politicians and landowners who claimed to speak for Bessarabia, and attended the Paris Peace Conference to lobby for the Russian cause. Among the other members of this body were Alexander N. Krupensky, Alexandr K. Schmidt, Vladimir Tsyganko, and Mark Slonim. They circulated rumors of "unheard-of atrocities" committed by the Romanian Army, such as the massacre of 53 people in one village of after the Khotyn Uprising, and the torturing of many others. These statements were rejected outright by the Bessarabian unionists, such as Ion Inculeț or Ion Pelivan.

Bibliography  
 Enciclopedia Chişinău. – Ch., 1997. – 156 p.
 *** - Enciclopedia sovietică moldovenească (Chișinău, 1970-1977)

References

External links  
 Primar –– Teodor Cojocaru

Politicians from Chișinău
Moldovan MPs 1917–1918
Moldovan Ministers of Justice
Date of birth missing
Date of death missing
Moldovan people of Ukrainian descent